Quiner is a surname. Notable people with the surname include:

Caroline Quiner (1839–1924), birth name of Caroline Ingalls, mother of Laura Ingalls Wilder
Joanna Quiner (1796–1868), American seamstress and sculptor

See also
Quine (surname)